The 2000 Benson & Hedges Cup was the twenty-ninth edition of cricket's Benson & Hedges Cup. The competition was won by Gloucestershire County Cricket Club, who defeated Glamorgan County Cricket Club in the final at Lord's on 10 June.

Midlands/West/Wales Group

North Group

South Group

Quarter-finals

Semi-finals

Final

See also
Benson & Hedges Cup

References

2000 in English cricket
Benson & Hedges Cup seasons